Přemysl Charvát (October 4, 1930 - November 20, 2005) was a Czech conductor from Prague. In his career he directed in the National Theater, Prague State Opera and was Artistic Director of the Symphony Orchestra at Prague Conservatory. One of his pupils was Adolf Melichar (born 1967) who is currently with the Prague State Opera.

Czech conductors (music)
Male conductors (music)
Musicians from Prague
1930 births
2005 deaths
20th-century conductors (music)
20th-century Czech male musicians